The following is a list of notable deaths in August 2021.

Entries for each day are listed alphabetically by surname. A typical entry lists information in the following sequence:
 Name, age, country of citizenship at birth, subsequent country of citizenship (if applicable), reason for notability, cause of death (if known), and reference.

August 2021

1
Abdalqadir as-Sufi, 91, Scottish Islamic scholar, founder of the Murabitun World Movement.
Charles Baranyanka, 86, Burundian diplomat and historian, ambassador to France and Switzerland (1965–1967).
David A. Gall, 79, Canadian Hall of Fame jockey.
Guy Herbulot, 96, French Roman Catholic prelate, bishop of Évry-Corbeil-Essonnes (1978–2000).
Omar Jazouli, 75, Moroccan politician, MP (since 1977) and mayor of Marrakesh (2003–2009), COVID-19.
Kazimierz Kowalski, 70, Polish opera singer, opera manager and television presenter.
Kyaw Hla Aung, 80, Burmese lawyer and civil rights activist.
Armin Lemme, 65, German Olympic discus thrower (1980).
Aliaksei Mzhachyk, 25, Belarusian Olympic weightlifter (2016), traffic collision.
Kihi Ngatai, 91, New Zealand Māori leader, member of the Waitangi Tribunal.
Mthokozisi Nxumalo, 32, South African politician, MP (since 2019), traffic collision.
Rossana Ordóñez, 70, Venezuelan journalist, pancreatic cancer.
Fiorentino Palmiotto, 92, Italian chess player, International Arbiter (1991).
Abe E. Pierce III, 86, American politician, mayor of Monroe, Louisiana (1996–2000).
Eddie Presland, 78, English footballer (West Ham United, Crystal Palace), cancer.
Gino Renni, 78, Italian-Argentine actor and singer, complications from COVID-19.
Vicente Rodríguez, 62, Paraguayan politician, deputy (since 2018) and governor of San Pedro (2013–2018), heart attack.
Peter F. Schabarum, 92, American football player (San Francisco 49ers) and politician, member of the California State Assembly (1967–1972) and Los Angeles County Board of Supervisors (1972–1991).
Ilona Royce Smithkin, 101, Polish-born American artist, author and model.
Vimla Sood, 98–99, Indian dentist, first female dentist in India.
Stephen Szára, 98, Hungarian-American chemist.
Ian Thomson, 92, English cricketer (national team).
Francisco Weffort, 84, Brazilian political scientist, minister of culture (1995–2002), heart attack.
Tom York, 96, American television personality (WBRC).
Yu Ying-shih, 91, Chinese-born American sinologist and historian.
Jerry Ziesmer, 82, American assistant director and actor (Apocalypse Now, Jerry Maguire, The Bad News Bears Go to Japan).

2
Alfonso Álvarez Gándara, 82, Spanish politician and lawyer, secretary-general of Partido Galeguista (1981–1982).
Lilia Aragón, 82, Mexican actress (De frente al sol, Más allá del puente, Velo de novia) and politician, deputy (2004–2006).
Rolf Arfwidsson, 93, Swedish curler.
Hendrik Born, 77, German naval officer, chief of the Volksmarine (1989–1990).
Robert H. Burnside, 88, American politician, member of the South Carolina House of Representatives (1971–1978).
Emilio Bianchi Di Cárcano, 91, Argentine Roman Catholic prelate, bishop of Azul (1982–2006).
Alicinha Cavalcanti, 59, Brazilian events promoter, complications from amyotrophic lateral sclerosis.
June Daugherty, 64, American college basketball coach (Boise State Broncos, Washington Huskies, Washington State Cougars).
Ged Dunn, 74, English rugby league footballer (Hull Kingston Rovers, national team).
Elbjørg Fjære, 88, Norwegian politician, deputy MP (1973–1977, 1981–1985).
Thor Helland, 84, Norwegian Olympic long-distance runner (1964).
Allen Hill, 84, British chemist.
Ruth Horam, 90, Israeli painter and sculptor.
Hideki Hosaka, 49, Japanese professional wrestler (FMW, AJPW, Zero-One), colon and liver cancer.
Ursula Kraus, 91, German politician, member of the Landtag of North Rhine-Westphalia (1984–1990) and mayor of Wuppertal (1984–1996).
Elias John Kwandikwa, 55, Tanzanian politician, MP (since 2015) and minister of defence (since 2020).
Marc Lieberman, 72, American humanitarian, prostate cancer.
Kalyani Menon, 80, Indian playback singer (Nallathoru Kudumbam, Pudhiya Mannargal, Paarthale Paravasam).
Nelliyode Vasudevan Namboodiri, 81, Indian Kathakali artist, pancreatic cancer.
Luigi Paleari, 79, Italian footballer (Como 1907, A.S.D. Fanfulla).
Runoko Rashidi, 67, American historian, author and scholar.
Fatima Regragui, 80, Moroccan actress.
Diego Rosas Anaya, 31, Mexican politician, State of Mexico deputy-elect, heart attack.
Dave Severance, 102, American Marine Corps colonel (Battle of Iwo Jima).
Peter Smith, Baron Smith of Leigh, 76, British politician and life peer, member of the House of Lords (since 1999).
Antonio de la Torre Villalpando, 69, Mexican footballer (América, Puebla, national team).
Yves de Wasseige, 95, Belgian politician and economist, senator (1979–1991).
Derek Williams, 91, British documentary film director (The Tide of Traffic, The Shetland Experience) and writer.
John Zulberti, 54, American college lacrosse player (Syracuse Orange), drowned.

3
Saggaf bin Muhammad Aljufri, 83, Indonesian Islamic scholar.
Julian Beale, 86, Australian businessman and politician, MP (1984–1996).
Allan Blazek, 71, American record producer, mixer and audio engineer.
Jocelyne Bourassa, 74, Canadian golfer (LPGA).
Duke Carmel, 84, American baseball player (St. Louis Cardinals).
Jerry Carter, 66, American politician and pastor, member of the North Carolina House of Representatives (since 2019), complications from surgery.
Tommy Curtis, 69, American college basketball player (UCLA Bruins), NCAA champion (1972, 1973).
Đỗ Quang Em, 79, Vietnamese painter.
Sir John Enderby, 90, British physicist.
Eric Freeman, 51, American artist.
Noel Guzmán Boffil Rojas, 66, Cuban painter and poet, COVID-19.
Jean Hale, 82, American actress (In Like Flint).
Jody Hamilton, 82, American professional wrestler (GCW), promoter (DSW) and trainer (WCW Power Plant).
Kelli Hand, 56, American musician and DJ.
Arthur Dion Hanna, 93, Bahamian politician, governor-general (2006–2010).
Jergé Hoefdraad, 35, Dutch footballer (RKC Waalwijk, Almere City, Telstar), complications from gunshot wounds.
Elizabeth Anne Hull, 84, American academic and political activist.
Khin Maung Win, 80, Burmese mathematician.
Yūsuke Kinoshita, 27, Japanese baseball player (Chunichi Dragons).
Fred Ladd, 94, American television producer.
Jørgen Langhelle, 55, Norwegian actor (Elling, I Am Dina, The Thing), cardiac arrest.
Miroslav Lazanski, 70, Serbian politician and diplomat, deputy (2016–2019) and ambassador to Russia (since 2019).
Noel Lynch, 74, Irish politician, member of the London Assembly (2003–2004).
Brian Maunsell, 83, New Zealand Olympic boxer (1964).
María Teresa Marú Mejía, 62, Mexican politician, deputy (since 2018), COVID-19.
Kazem Mohammadi, 47, Iranian futsal player (Tam Iran Khodro, national team), COVID-19.
Pierre Montaz, 97, French cable transport engineer.
Lorris Murail, 70, French author.
Antonio Pennacchi, 71, Italian writer, Strega Prize winner (2010), heart attack.
Nader Shariatmadari, 60, Iranian politician and geotechnical engineer, member of the Islamic City Council of Tehran (2003–2007), COVID-19.
Gholam Hosein Shiri Aliabad, 60, Iranian politician, MP (2012–2016), complications from COVID-19.
Vitaly Shishov, 26, Belarusian human rights activist.
Soerjadi Soedirdja, 82, Indonesian politician, governor of Jakarta (1992–1997).
Catherine Squires, 80, American microbiologist.
Allan Stephenson, 71, British-born South African composer, cellist, and conductor.
José Ramos Tinhorão, 93, Brazilian music critic and journalist, pneumonia.
Godfred Yeboah, 41, Ghanaian footballer (Asante Kotoko, All Stars, national team).

4
R. Aravamudan, 84, Indian aerospace engineer.
Aleksandr Aravin, 63, Russian film director.
Razzy Bailey, 82, American country musician ("Midnight Hauler", "She Left Love All Over Me", "I Keep Coming Back").
Toupta Boguena, Chadian agronomist, minister of health (2010–2011), secretary of the Niger Basin Authority (since 2016).
Karl Heinz Bohrer, 88, German literary scholar and essayist.
Zelá Brambillé, 27, Mexican writer and novelist, COVID-19.
Jean "Binta" Breeze, 65, Jamaican dub poet, chronic obstructive pulmonary disease.
Cándani, 56, Surinamese-Dutch poet, writer, and painter, cancer.
Bobby Eaton, 62, American professional wrestler (JCP, WCW, SMW).
Richard T. Farmer, 86, American businessman and philanthropist, founder and CEO of Cintas (1968–2003).
Dick Farrel, 65, American radio host, complications from COVID-19.
María Ester Feres, 78, Chilean politician and academic.
Martin Graff, 77, French writer and cabaretist.
Aimé Halbeher, 85, French political activist and syndicalist.
Paul Johnson, 50, American DJ ("Get Get Down") and record producer, COVID-19.
David Lee, 80, American jazz drummer and composer.
John H. Logie, 81, American politician, mayor of Grand Rapids, Michigan (1991–2003), complications from Alzheimer's disease.
Åke Lundqvist, 85, Swedish actor (Beck – Mannen med ikonerna).
Graham McRae, 81, New Zealand racing driver.
Dominic Oneya, 73, Nigerian civil servant, administrator of Kano State (1996–1998) and Benue State (1998–1999).
J. R. Richard, 71, American baseball player (Houston Astros), complications from COVID-19.
Padma Sachdev, 81, Indian poet and novelist.
Bo Scott, 78, American football player (Cleveland Browns, Ottawa Rough Riders).
Dario Sorrentino, 64, Italian medical researcher, traffic collision.
Moisés Torres, 72, Bolivian journalist, professor and politician, deputy (1997–2002), COVID-19.
Betty Lou Varnum, 90, American television presenter (The Magic Window).
Oddlaug Vereide, 88, Norwegian politician, deputy MP (1989–1994).
Tachi Yamada, 76, Japanese-born American physician and gastroenterologist.
Laurence R. Young, 85, American physicist.

5
Maurice Brun, 96, French politician, mayor of Montluçon (1972–1977) and deputy (1973–1978).
Terry Davies, 87, Welsh rugby union player (Swansea, British & Irish Lions, national team).
Hanns Eckelkamp, 94, German film producer (The Marriage of Maria Braun).
Guillermo González, 80, Colombian engineer and politician, mayor of Popayán (1977–1978), minister of national defense (1997), and governor of Cauca (2008–2011).
Reg Gorman, 89, Australian actor (The Sullivans, Fergus McPhail, Neighbours), cancer.
Eloise Greenfield, 91, American author (Childtimes: A Three-Generation Memoir, The Great Migration: Journey to the North).
Brian Henderson, 89, New Zealand-born Australian radio and television presenter (Nine News Sydney, Bandstand), kidney cancer.
Hassaballah El Kafrawy, 90, Egyptian politician, governor of Damietta (1976–1977) and minister of housing (1977–1993).
Roger Lenaers, 96, Belgian-born Austrian Jesuit pastor.
Leon Litwack, 91, American historian (Been in the Storm So Long), Pulitzer Prize winner (1980), bladder cancer.
E. Madhusudhanan, 80, Indian politician, Tamil Nadu MLA (1991–1996).
Yevhen Marchuk, 80, Ukrainian politician, prime minister (1995–1996), deputy (1995–2000), and minister of defence (2003–2004), COVID-19.
Jan Mayman, 80, Australian journalist (The Sunday Times, The Age, The Canberra Times).
S. S. Narayan, 86, Indian Olympic footballer (1956, 1960), cardiac arrest.
Jane Ngwenya, 86, Zimbabwean politician, MP (1980–1985).
Gábor Novák, 87, Hungarian sprint canoer, Olympic silver medalist (1952).
Murray Rose, 81, New Zealand politician, MP (1969–1972).
Geoffrey Scott, 83, Canadian politician, MP (1978–1993).
Andrei Strâmbeanu, 86, Moldovan writer and politician, deputy (1998–2001).
Richard Trumka, 72, American labor leader, president of the AFL–CIO (since 2009) and the United Mine Workers (1982–1995), heart attack.
Vito Valentinetti, 92, American baseball player (Chicago Cubs, Washington Senators, Cleveland Indians).
Walter Wangerin Jr., 77, American author (The Book of the Dun Cow).
Russ Washington, 74, American football player (San Diego Chargers).
Graeme Whitnall, 69, Australian footballer (Carlton).

6
H. Muhammad Amin, 61, Indonesian politician, vice-governor of West Nusa Tenggara (2013–2018), complications from COVID-19.
Mikel Azurmendi, 78, Spanish anthropologist, ETA dissident and writer, co-founder of Foro Ermua and ¡Basta Ya!.
Noureddine Bahbouh, 72, Algerian politician, minister of agriculture (1994–1995) and agriculture and fisheries (1995–1997), member of the People's National Assembly (1997–2002).
Barry, American barred owl, traffic collision.
Margaret Bourke, 75, Australian bridge player, melanoma.
José Carreira Marques, 77, Portuguese politician, member of the Constituent Assembly (1975–1976), deputy (1976–1982) and mayor of Beja (1983–2005), cardiac arrest.
Francesco Dibenedetto, 80, Italian football manager (Matera Calcio, Bisceglie, U.S.D. Città di Fasano).
Rita Pitka Blumenstein, 84–85, American Yup'ik traditional healer.
Stefano Di Marino, 60, Italian novelist and translator, suicide by jumping.
Christian Dumont, 58, French Olympic biathlete (1988, 1992), heart attack.
Ed Emery, 71, American politician, member of the Missouri House of Representatives (2003–2011) and Senate (2013–2021).
Salvador Escrihuela, 70, Spanish footballer (Sabadell, Granada, Alavés).
Aryeh Gamliel, 70, Israeli rabbi and politician, member of the Knesset (1988–2003).
Einar Holm, 87, Norwegian politician, deputy MP (1981–1985).
Babulal Jain, 86, Indian politician, Madhya Pradesh MLA (1977–1980).
Donald Kagan, 89, Lithuanian-born American historian.
Richard Konvička, 64, Czech painter.
Teresa Miller, 59, American author, legal scholar, and educator.
John A. Rizzo, 73, American attorney.
Herbert Schlosser, 95, American television executive, president and CEO of NBC (1974–1978).
Tigor Silaban, 68, Indonesian doctor. 
Oleg Shapovalov, 58, Ukrainian politician, president of the Kharkiv Oblast Council (2005–2006).
Jakob Skarstein, 100, Norwegian journalist.
Yevgen Sotnikov, 40, Ukrainian judoka and convicted murderer, shot.
Yuri Trutnev, 93, Russian theoretical physicist and nuclear engineer.
Mark Turpin, 64, American tennis player.
Les Vandyke, 90, English singer and songwriter ("What Do You Want?", "Poor Me", "Well I Ask You").
Wang Wenjuan, 94, Chinese Yue opera performer.

7
Dalal Abdel Aziz, 61, Egyptian actress (A Girl's Secret, Sorry for the Disturbance, El Ashash), complications from COVID-19.
Akhudiat, 75, Indonesian poet.
Brad Allan, 48, Australian martial artist, action choreographer, and stunt performer (Rush Hour 2, Scott Pilgrim vs. the World, Solo: A Star Wars Story).
Rolf Erling Andersen, 74, Norwegian politician, deputy MP (1997–2005).
Julio César Anderson, 73, Guatemalan footballer (C.S.D. Municipal, national team).
Douglas Applegate, 93, American politician, member of the U.S. House of Representatives (1977–1995).
Paul Bragdon, 94, American academic.
Robbie Cooke, 64, English footballer (Peterborough United, Cambridge United, Brentford), cancer.
Alma Cullen, 83, British television writer (Inspector Morse) and playwright.
Mike De Palmer, 59, American tennis player and coach (Boris Becker), pancreatic cancer.
John Dickinson, 87, English rugby league player (St Helens).
Sir Patrick Forrest, 98, Scottish surgeon.
Magda Godia, 68, Spanish politician, mayor of Mequinenza (since 2003) and member of the Cortes of Aragon (2013–2015), cancer.
José Gómez del Moral, 89, Spanish road racing cyclist.
Johnny Groth, 95, American baseball player (Detroit Tigers, Chicago White Sox, Kansas City Athletics).
Robert Martin Gumbura, 65, Zimbabwean preacher and convicted rapist, COVID-19.
Carol Harris, 98, American Hall of Fame Quarter Horse equestrian, cancer.
Albert B. Lewis, 95, American politician, member of the New York State Senate (1967–1972, 1973–1978), .
Hung Liu, 73, Chinese-born American artist, pancreatic cancer.
Isabel Martínez, 75, Mexican actress and comedian, heart attack.
Trevor Moore, 41, American comedian (The Whitest Kids U' Know) and actor (Miss March), fall.
Purnendu Sekhar Mukherjee, Indian politician, chronic obstructive pulmonary disease.
Keith Patchel, 65, American musician and composer.
Alfredo Petit-Vergel, 85, Cuban Roman Catholic prelate, auxiliary bishop of San Cristóbal de la Habana (1991–2016).
Markie Post, 70, American actress (Night Court, The Fall Guy, Hearts Afire), cancer.
Amando Samo, 72, Micronesian Roman Catholic prelate, bishop of Caroline Islands (1995–2020).
Larry Swider, 66, American football player (Detroit Lions, St. Louis Cardinals, Tampa Bay Buccaneers).
Michael M. Thomas, 85, American writer.
Werner Tochtermann, 87, German chemist.
Mohammad Hadis Uddin, 72, Bangladeshi police officer, IGP (2005), COVID-19.
Melinda Vigh, 39, Hungarian sport climber, fall.
Mark Weedon, 53, New Zealand rugby union player (Bay of Plenty, North Harbour, Wasps).
Willie Williamson, 76, American football coach (Albany State Golden Rams).
Jane Withers, 95, American actress (Giant, The Hunchback of Notre Dame, Paddy O'Day).
Gary Lee Yoder, 75, American musician (The Oxford Circle, Blue Cheer).
Wasi Zafar, 72, Pakistani lawyer and politician, MP (2002–2008) and minister of law and justice (2006–2007).

8
Bobby Bowden, 91, American Hall of Fame college football coach (Florida State, West Virginia), pancreatic cancer.
Paul Brewster, 85, American college football coach (Austin Peay).
Sarah Broadie, 79, British philosopher.
Najma Chowdhury, 79, Bangladeshi academic, COVID-19.
Ken Clark, 73, English-born Canadian football player (Hamilton Tiger-Cats, Saskatchewan Roughriders, Los Angeles Rams).
Bruce Conte, 71, American guitarist (Tower of Power), leukemia.
Bill Davis, 92, Canadian politician, Ontario MPP (1959–1985) premier (1971–1985).
Aleksej Demjanov, 47, Croatian-Russian Olympic gymnast (1996).
Christian Penda Ekoka, 69, Cameroonian government official.
Vera Fusek, 89, Czechoslovak-born British actress (The Great Van Robbery, Doctor Who).
Lila R. Gleitman, 91, American academic (University of Pennsylvania).
Maria José Gonzaga, 75, Brazilian businesswoman, philanthropist and politician, mayor of Tatuí (since 2017), abdominal cancer.
Perry Harris, 75, New Zealand rugby union player (Manawatu, national team).
Paul Hellyer, 98, Canadian politician, MP (1949–1974), minister of national defence (1963–1967) and transport (1967–1969), complications from a fall.
Ben Kamin, 68, American rabbi, heart failure.
Stefan Kapłaniak, 88, Polish Olympic sprint canoer, bronze medalist (1960).
Jaan Kaplinski, 80, Estonian poet, translator, and philosopher, complications from amyotrophic lateral sclerosis.
Garry Kennedy, 85, Canadian artist and educator.
Fernando López de Olmedo, Spanish general commander of Ceuta (Perejil Island crisis), COVID-19.
Mohammad Reza Madhi, Iranian alleged intelligence agent.
Colum McKinstry, 71, Irish Gaelic football player (Clan na Gael, Armagh).
Hosa Wells Okunbo, 63, Nigerian oil executive and philanthropist, cancer.
Izidorio Oliveira, 92, Brazilian politician, deputy (1995–1999), complications from COVID-19.
Adelaide Pereira da Silva, 93, Brazilian pianist, composer and painter.
Luciano Pérez de Acevedo, 78, Spanish politician and lawyer, president of the province of Badajoz (1979–1983) and member of the Assembly of Extremadura (1983–1987).
Tindivanam K. Ramamurthy, 86, Indian politician, Tamil Nadu MLA (1967–1971) and MP (1984–1990).
Hipólito Reyes Larios, 74, Mexican Roman Catholic prelate, archbishop of Xalapa (since 2007) and bishop of Orizaba (2000–2007), internal hemorrhage.
Oleksandr Rojtburd, 59, Ukrainian painter and installation artist, director of the Odesa Fine Arts Museum (2018–2019), cancer.
Cesare Salvadori, 79, Italian fencer, Olympic champion (1972).
Bonnie Sherk, 76, American artist.
Anupam Shyam, 63, Indian actor (Hazaaron Khwaishein Aisi, Slumdog Millionaire, The Curse of King Tut's Tomb), multiple organ failure.
Harry Smith, 91, American bowler.
Pierre Sprey, 84, French-born American defence analyst (Fighter Mafia) and record producer, founder of Mapleshade Records.

9
Joey Ambrose, 87, American Hall of Fame saxophonist (Bill Haley & His Comets).
Rand Araskog, 89, American businessman, CEO of ITT Corporation (1979–1998).
Aung Cheint, 73, Burmese poet.
Sir Lester Bird, 83, Antiguan politician, prime minister (1994–2004).
Cameron Burrell, 26, American sprinter, suicide by gunshot.
María Elena Chapa, 77, Mexican politician and women's rights activist, deputy (1988–1991, 2000–2003) and senator (1991–1997), cancer.
Carlton H. Colwell, 95, American politician, member of the Georgia House of Representatives (1964–1995).
Alex Cord, 88, American actor (Airwolf, Stagecoach, The Brotherhood).
Neal Craig, 73, American football player (Cincinnati Bengals, Buffalo Bills, Cleveland Browns).
Gord Cruickshank, 56, Canadian ice hockey player (Maine Mariners).
Kasargod Patnashetti Gopal Rao, 94, Indian naval officer (Operation Trident).
Roy F. Guste, 69, American author, photographer and culinary historian.
Pat Hitchcock, 93, English-born American actress (Stage Fright, Strangers on a Train, Psycho).
František Hrúzik, 94, Slovak Olympic equestrian (1960).
Ken Hutchison, 72, Scottish actor (Straw Dogs, All Quiet on the Western Front, Ladyhawke).
Ryszard Jarzembowski, 75, Polish politician and journalist, senator (1991–2005).
Bob Jenkins, 73, American motorsports announcer (ESPN, ABC, NBC Sports), brain cancer.
Killer Kau, 23, South African rapper, dancer, and record producer, traffic collision.
Joseph Koterski, 67, American Jesuit priest, philosopher and author.
Sergei Kovalev, 91, Russian human rights activist and politician, deputy (1993–2003).
Jean-Marie Léonard, 78, Belgian politician, deputy (1990–1995), Walloon deputy (1990–2004).
Viktor Likhonosov, 85, Russian writer, COVID-19.
Olivier Maire, 60, French Roman Catholic priest, homicide.
Mpura, 25, South African rapper, record producer, and fashion designer, traffic collision.
Annette Muller, 88, French writer and Holocaust survivor.
Craig Ogletree, 53, American football player (Cincinnati Bengals), complications from COVID-19.
Olivia Podmore, 24, New Zealand Olympic cyclist (2016).
Peter Richter de Rangenier, 91, Czech-born Austrian composer and conductor.
Ingrid Remmers, 56, German politician, MP (since 2017).
Ian Russell, 86, English Anglican priest, Archdeacon of Coventry (1989–2000).
Saranya Sasi, 35, Indian actress (Maanikyan, Chotta Mumbai, Annmariya Kalippilaanu), cancer.
*Siti Sarah, 36, Malaysian singer and actress, COVID-19.
Nadir Tedeschi, 90, Italian politician, deputy (1976–1987).
Chucky Thompson, 53, American record producer (Bad Boy Records), complications from COVID-19.
Naftali Tishby, 68, Israeli computer scientist.
Ary Ribeiro Valadão, 102, Brazilian lawyer and politician, Goiás MLA (1959–1967), deputy (1967–1979, 1989–1991), and governor of Goiás (1979–1983).
Walter Yetnikoff, 87, American music industry executive (CBS Records International), cancer.
*Zairaini Sarbini, 48, Malaysian voice actress, cervical cancer.

10
Gun Ädel, 82, Swedish Olympic cross-country skier (1964).
Sabina Ajrula, 75, Macedonian-Turkish actress (Muhteşem Yüzyıl, My Mother's Wound, Shadows), brain cancer.
Júlio Chaves, 76, Brazilian voice actor, COVID-19.
Neal Conan, 71, American radio journalist (Talk of the Nation), glioblastoma.
Tony Esposito, 78, Canadian-American Hall of Fame ice hockey player (Chicago Black Hawks, Montreal Canadiens), Stanley Cup champion (1969), pancreatic cancer.
Petr Esterka, 85, Czech Roman Catholic prelate, auxiliary bishop of Brno (1999–2013) and titular bishop of Cefala (since 1999).
Michael Gaudion, 83, Australian footballer (North Melbourne).
Tamara Jozi, 64, South African actress (Isibaya, Reyka) and television personality.
Maki Kaji, 69, Japanese businessman, president of Nikoli and creator of Sudoku, bile duct cancer.
Michel Le Flochmoan, 69, French football player and manager (Sedan, R.E. Virton, F91 Dudelange).
Giorgio Lopez, 74, Italian voice actor, dubbing director and theatre director.
Cary M. Maguire, 93, American businessman and philanthropist.
Samuel Marful-Sau, 64, Ghanaian jurist, judge of the Supreme Court (since 2018).
Eduardo Martínez Somalo, 94, Spanish Roman Catholic cardinal, camerlengo of the Holy Roman Church (1993–2007), prefect of the CICLSAL (1992–2004) and apostolic nuncio to Colombia (1975–1979).
Don McKechnie, 77, New Zealand cricketer (Otago) and cricket umpire.
Rich Oganiru, Nigerian actor.
Lev Pidlisetskyi, 44, Ukrainian politician and entrepreneur, MP (2014–2019).
Dudley Price, 89, Welsh footballer (Swansea City, Hull City, Southend United).
John Riordan, 85, New Zealand jockey.
Vincent M. Russo, 90, American lieutenant general.
Kirpal Singh, 95, Indian naval officer.
Mirjana Stefanović, 81, Serbian writer.
Pio Teek, 74, Namibian judge, justice of the Supreme Court (2003–2005).
Naga Thein Hlaing, 87, Burmese surgeon.
Dilys Watling, 78, English actress (Calculated Risk, Two Left Feet, Theatre of Death).
Peter Whittle, 94, New Zealand mathematician and statistician.
Stephen Wilkinson, 102, English choral conductor and composer.

11
Geneviève Asse, 98, French painter.
Marco Borradori, 62, Swiss politician, national councillor (1991–1995) and mayor of Lugano (since 2013), heart attack.
Clyde Evans, 83, American politician, member of the Ohio House of Representatives (2003–2010).
Mike Finnigan, 76, American keyboardist and vocalist, kidney cancer.
Peter Fleischmann, 84, German film director (Hunting Scenes from Bavaria, Weak Spot, Hard to Be a God) and screenwriter.
Adela Forestello, 98, Argentine human rights activist (Mothers of the Plaza 25 de Mayo).
Roy Gaines, 83, American blues guitarist.
Gianluigi Gelmetti, 75, Italian-Monégasque conductor and composer, director of the Teatro dell'Opera di Roma (2000–2009).
Benoît Genecand, 57, Swiss politician, national councilor (2015–2019), cancer.
Dick Huddart, 85, English rugby league player (St. Helens, St. George, national team).
Paulo José, 84, Brazilian actor (The Priest and the Girl, Macunaíma, The Clown), pneumonia.
Michel Laclotte, 91, French art historian, director of the Louvre (1987–1995).
Abdelhamid Laghouati, 77, Algerian poet.
Guy Lalumière, 91, Canadian graphic designer and photographer.
Sir David Levene, 91, New Zealand businessman and philanthropist.
Stanley Okoro, 28, Nigerian actor, food poisoning.
Caroline Peyton, 69, American singer-songwriter.
Adam Sadowsky, 50, American entrepreneur and actor (It's Your Move, Second Chance).
Hugo Salas Wenzel, 85, Chilean military officer and convicted murderer.
Ernst-Ludwig Schwandner, 83, German architecture historian and archaeologist.
Miroslav Tetter, 83, Czech academic and politician, mayor of České Budějovice (1998–2006, 2010).
Carveth Thompson, 88, American politician, member of the South Dakota House of Representatives (1968–1972).
Bill Todd, 91, Canadian football player (Saskatchewan Roughriders, Winnipeg Blue Bombers).
Lorna Toolis, 68, Canadian librarian.
Claudio Ventura, 67, Italian film director and editor.
Ernst van de Wetering, 83, Dutch art historian.
Göran Zachrisson, 83, Swedish sports journalist, cancer.
Yehoshua Zuckerman, 83, Belgian-born Israeli rabbi.

12
Kurt Biedenkopf, 91, German politician, MP (1976–1980, 1987–1990) and minister-president of Saxony (1990–2002).
Ronnell Bright, 91, American jazz pianist.
Brian P. Burns, 85, American entrepreneur, attorney and philanthropist.
Durdana Butt, 83, Pakistani actress (Ruswai, Tanhaiyaan, Tanhaiyan Naye Silsilay), COVID-19.
Haydée Coloso-Espino, 83, Filipino Olympic swimmer (1960).
Dominic DeNucci, 89, Italian-American Hall of Fame professional wrestler (Stampede Wrestling, WCW, WWWF) and trainer, heart failure.
Eva Fastag, 104, Polish-born Belgian Holocaust survivor.
Jay Greenberg, 71, American sports journalist (The Kansas City Star, Philadelphia Daily News, New York Post).
Karl-Friedrich Haas, 90, German sprinter, Olympic silver medalist (1956).
Stanislav Hanzík, 90, Czech sculptor.
Roger Harring, 88, American Hall of Fame college football coach (Wisconsin-La Crosse).
Claude Javeau, 80, Belgian sociologist and professor.
João Lyra, 90, Brazilian politician, senator (1989–1991) and deputy (2003–2007, 2011–2015).
Tarcísio Meira, 85, Brazilian actor (Irmãos Coragem, Sangue e Areia, Espelho Mágico), COVID-19.
Robert Orr, 68, American business executive, ambassador to the Asian Development Bank (2010–2016).
Jose P. Perez, 74, Filipino jurist, associate justice of the Supreme Court (2009–2016).
Pyotr Pimashkov, 73, Russian politician, mayor of Krasnoyarsk (1996–2011) and deputy (since 2011).
Peter Ryan, 84, Australian footballer (South Melbourne).
K. Schippers, 84, Dutch poet.
Alfonso Sepúlveda, 82, Chilean footballer (Club Universidad de Chile).
Hadiza Shagari, 80, Nigerian socialite, first lady (1979–1983), COVID-19.
Una Stubbs, 84, English actress (Till Death Us Do Part, Worzel Gummidge, Sherlock).
Igael Tumarkin, 87, Israeli painter and sculptor.
Andrew Walls, 93, British Christianity scholar.
Stephen Wiesner, 78, American-Israeli research physicist.

13
Arctic Owl, 27, British Thoroughbred racehorse. (death announced on this date)
Carlos Ardila Lülle, 91, Colombian entrepreneur, founder of Organización Ardila Lülle.
Alia Muhammad Baker, 69, Iraqi librarian, COVID-19.
Osório Bebber, 92, Brazilian Roman Catholic prelate, bishop of Tubarão (1981–1992), Coxim (1992–1999), and Joaçaba (1999–2003).
Kelsey Begaye, 70, American politician, president of the Navajo Nation (1999–2003).
Franck Berrier, 37, French football player (Cannes, Zulte Waregem, Oostende) and manager, heart attack.
Andrzej Borodzik, 91, Polish politician, chemist and scout leader, deputy (1965–1972), president of ZHP (2005–2007).
Peter Cavanaugh, 79, American radio DJ.
Enzo Facciolo, 89, Italian comic book artist (Diabolik).
Georg Gallus, 94, German politician, MP (1970–1994).
Ernest Gondzik, 90, Polish Olympic wrestler (1952, 1960).
Nanci Griffith, 68, American singer-songwriter ("Love at the Five and Dime", "Outbound Plane"), Grammy winner (1994).
Egon Guttman, 94, German-born American law professor.
Alejandro Guzmán Brito, 76, Chilean lawyer and historian, COVID-19.
Stanley S. Harris, 93, American jurist, judge of the U.S. District Court for the District of Columbia (1983–2001) and the District of Columbia Court of Appeals (1972–1982).
James Hormel, 88, American philanthropist, LGBT activist and diplomat, ambassador to Luxembourg (1999–2001).
Henryk Hoser, 78, Polish Roman Catholic prelate, archbishop of Warszawa-Praga (2008–2017), COVID-19.
Ahmed Joda, 91, Nigerian government administrator.
Charlie Johnson, 69, American football player (Philadelphia Eagles, Minnesota Vikings).
Leon Kopelman, 97, Polish-Israeli, last known surviving fighter of the Warsaw Ghetto Uprising.
Mangkunegara IX, 69, Indonesian royal, Duke of Mangkunegaran (since 1987).
Vladimir Mendelssohn, 71, Romanian composer and violist.
Angela Milner, 73, British paleontologist.
Rich Milot, 64, American football player (Washington Redskins), Super Bowl champion (1982, 1987).
Marek Minda, 71, Polish doctor and politician, senator (1993–1997).
Rhys Morgan, 67, Welsh rugby union player (national team).
Kaycee Moore, 77, American actress (Killer of Sheep, Bless Their Little Hearts, Daughters of the Dust).
Carmen Morales, 81, Argentine actress (Los caballeros de la cama redonda).
Keitumetse Paul, 48, Botswana football player.
Sir Michael Peckham, 86, British oncologist and artist.
Steve Perrin, 75, American game designer (RuneQuest), technical writer and editor.
Jean-Pierre Pichard, 75, French musician and academic.
Pil Trafa, 62, Argentine singer and composer (Los Violadores).
Carolyn S. Shoemaker, 92, American astronomer, co-discoverer of Comet Shoemaker–Levy 9, complications from a fall.
Gino Strada, 73, Italian human rights activist and war surgeon, founder of Emergency, heart attack.
Bobby Stein, 82, Scottish footballer (Raith Rovers, Montrose).
Matthias U Shwe, 77, Burmese Roman Catholic prelate, auxiliary bishop (1979–1989) and bishop of Taunggyi (1989–2015).
Andrew Turton, 83, English anthropologist.
Dante C. Youla, 95, American engineer and control theorist.

14
Mian Bashir Ahmed, 97, Indian Islamic scholar and religious leader, four-time Jammu and Kashmir MLA.
Boonruen Choonhavan, 101, Thai socialite, spouse of the prime minister (1988–1991), COVID-19.
Carlos Correia, 87, Bissau-Guinean politician, prime minister (1991–1994, 1997–1998, 2008–2009, 2015–2016).
Piera Degli Esposti, 83, Italian actress (A Joke of Destiny, Sweet Dreams, Il divo), heart failure.
Gabriel Fortuné, Haitian politician, mayor of Les Cayes (since 2016), earthquake.
Jacques Fournier, 92, French government official, president of SNCF (1988–1993).
Jerry Fujio, 81, Japanese singer and actor (Yojimbo, Ereki no Wakadaishō, The Stingiest Man in Town), COPD.
Robin Hahn, 88, Canadian Olympic equestrian (1968, 1972, 1976).
Sol Kimel, 92, Israeli chemical physicist.
Ibrahim Kalil Konaté, 44, Guinean politician, minister of national education and literacy (2017–2018), COVID-19.
Buckie Leach, 62, American fencer and coach, motorcycle accident.
Brigitte Maillard, 66, French writer and singer.
Virginia Moreno, 98, Filipino writer.
Francis Mossman, 33, New Zealand actor (Ruben Guthrie).
Igor Oistrakh, 90, Ukrainian violinist and teacher (Moscow Conservatory)
Enrique Pérez Parrilla, 73, Spanish politician, president of Cabildo de Lanzarote (1983–1987, 1994–1995, 1996–2003) and mayor of Arrecife (2007–2009), heart attack.
Algirdas Pocius, 90, Lithuanian politician, deputy (1992–1996).
Dako Radošević, 86, Bosnian Olympic discus thrower (1956, 1964).
R. Murray Schafer, 88, Canadian composer and writer, complications from Alzheimer's disease.
Mickey Stephens, 77, American politician, member of the Georgia House of Representatives (since 2009).
Fez Whatley, 57, American comedian and radio host (Ron and Fez), heart failure.
Hugh Wood, 89, British composer.

15
Usmankhan Alimov, 71, Uzbek Islamic cleric, chief mufti (since 2006).
Arthur J. Ammann, 85, American immunologist.
Ruth Apilado, 113, American newspaper editor and civil rights activist, founder of America's Intercultural Magazine.
Philip James Ayres, 77, Australian literary historian.
Jan Knippers Black, 81, American academic.
Abdelhamid Brahimi, 85, Algerian politician, prime minister (1984–1988).
Lester Coleman, 77, American author (Trail of the Octopus).
Gianfranco D'Angelo, 84, Italian actor (La liceale, La compagna di banco) and comedian (Drive In).
James DeMile, 82–83, American martial artist.
Ann Lawrence Durviaux, 53, Belgian jurist and professor, shot.
Roque Ferriols, 96, Filipino Jesuit priest and philosopher.
Paulette Goodman, 88, French-born American LGBT activist, president of PFLAG (1988–1992).
Francesco Gullino, 76, Italian-born Danish murder suspect, agent of the Bulgarian State Intelligence Agency.
Alena Hatvani, 46, Czech bodybuilder. (death announced on this date)
Hiro, 90, Japanese-born American commercial photographer.
Karen Fort Hood, 68, American jurist, judge of the Michigan Court of Appeals (since 2003).
Claude Hudelot, 79, French sinologist and radio producer.
Jagjit Kaur, 91, Indian playback singer (Shagoon).
Evelyn Lavu, Papua New Guinean pathologist. (death announced on this date)
Nathalie Maillet, 51, French architect and racecar driver, shot.
Paul Mitchell, 64, American businessman and politician, member of the U.S. House of Representatives (2017–2021), kidney cancer.
Giuseppe Montalbano, 96, Italian politician, mayor of Sambuca di Sicilia (1964–1980) and senator (1979–1987).
Gerd Müller, 75, German footballer (1861 Nördlingen, Bayern Munich, West Germany national team), world champion (1974), complications from Alzheimer's disease.
Abdur Rahim, 68, Bangladeshi military officer, director general of National Security Intelligence (2001–2005), COVID-19.
Rafael Romero, 83, Venezuelan Olympic sprinter (1956, 1960, 1964).
Mike Rose, 77, American education scholar.
Greg Rowlands, 73, New Zealand rugby union player (Bay of Plenty, national team).
Dick Schafrath, 84, American football player (Cleveland Browns) and politician, member of the Ohio Senate (1987–2000).
Ernie Sigley, 82, Australian radio and television presenter (Sunnyside Up, Adelaide Tonight, Wheel of Fortune) and singer, complications from Alzheimer's disease.
Jan David Simon, 3rd Viscount Simon, 81, British hereditary peer, member of the House of Lords (since 1994).
Joe Walton, 85, American football player (Washington Redskins, New York Giants) and coach (New York Jets).
Gary Woollard, 79, New Zealand rugby league player (Wellington, Auckland, national team).

16
Stanley Aronowitz, 88, American sociologist, author, and political activist.
Fernando Curiel, 79, Mexican writer, lawyer, and academic. (death announced on this date)
Donald G. Dunn, 98, American World War II veteran, Silver Star recipient.
Hormoz Farhat, 93, Iranian-American composer and ethnomusicologist.
William R. Haine, 77, American politician, member of the Illinois Senate (2002–2019).
Volodymyr Holubnychy, 85, Ukrainian race walker, Olympic champion (1960, 1968).
Qazi Massarrat Hussain, 86, Pakistani field hockey player, Olympic silver medalist (1956).
Carlos Iturralde Ballivián, 80, Bolivian diplomat and politician, ambassador to the United States (1978–1979) and foreign minister (1989–1992).
Oswaldo Johnston, 91, Guatemalan Olympic wrestler (1952).
Anandha Kannan, 48, Singaporean actor (Adhisaya Ulagam) and television host, cancer.
Inger Koedt, 106, Danish resistance movement rescuer.
Sean Lock, 58, English comedian (15 Storeys High, 8 Out of 10 Cats, 8 Out of 10 Cats Does Countdown), lung cancer.
Timothy McDarrah, 59, American journalist, gossip columnist, and art gallery owner, leukemia.
Duda Mendonça, 77, Brazilian propagandist and political strategist.
Abdullah Mokoginta, 86, Indonesian politician, MP (1992–1999).
Paul Muegge, 84, American politician, member of the Oklahoma Senate (1990–2002).
Adedayo Omolafe, 57, Nigerian politician, member of the House of Representatives.
John Pease, 77, American football player and coach (Utah Utes, New Orleans Saints, Jacksonville Jaguars).
Bishwaishwar Ramsaroop, 81, Guyanese politician, vice president (1980–1984).
Yvonne Pope Sintes, 90, South African-born British aviator, pneumonia.
Omrane Sadok, 83, Tunisian Olympic boxer (1960).
Hiroshi Sakagami, 85, Japanese author, cancer.
Simão Sessim, 85, Brazilian lawyer and politician, deputy (1979–2019), COVID-19.
Lucille Times, 100, American civil rights activist, COVID-19.
Maurice Watkins, 79, British sports administrator and solicitor (Manchester United), prostate cancer.
Marilynn Webb, 83, New Zealand artist.

17
Olav Akselsen, 55, Norwegian politician, MP (1989–2009) and minister of petroleum and energy (2000–2001).
Sheila Bromberg, 92, British harpist.
David W. J. Brown, 79, English cricketer (Gloucestershire).
Joe Chasteen, 96, American politician, member of the Wyoming House of Representatives (1973–1977).
Rock Demers, 87, Canadian film producer (The Dog Who Stopped the War, The Peanut Butter Solution, Vincent and Me), heart failure.
Yvon Duhamel, 81, Canadian motorcycle racer.
Guo Jingkun, 87, Chinese scientist, member of the Chinese Academy of Sciences.
Ágnes Hankiss, 71, Hungarian politician, MEP (2009–2014).
Chicken Hirsh, 81, American drummer (Country Joe and the Fish).
Bert Holcroft, 96, British rugby league player and coach (Eastern Suburbs).
Anwar Hossain, 83, Bangladeshi entrepreneur, industrialist and politician, MP (1988–1990).
Kazenambo Kazenambo, 58, Namibian politician, MP (2004–2014), complications from COVID-19.
Nikolai Kuimov, 63, Russian test pilot, Hero of the Russian Federation (2006), air crash.
Jack Lamb, 85, Canadian football player (Edmonton Eskimos, Calgary Stampeders).
Tom Larkin, 103, New Zealand public servant and diplomat, ambassador to Japan (1972–1976).
Chong-Sik Lee, 90, North Korean-born American political scientist.
Thierry Liagre, 70, French actor (The Cabbage Soup, Les Visiteurs, Crimson Rivers II: Angels of the Apocalypse).
Ibrahim Mantu, 74, Nigerian politician, member (1999–2007) and deputy president of the Senate, complications from COVID-19.
Basil Mramba, 81, Tanzanian politician, minister of finance (2001–2005), complications from COVID-19.
Eddie Paskey, 81, American actor (Star Trek).
Paulão, 51, Angolan footballer (Benfica, Espinho, national team).
Rodrigo Paz, 87, Ecuadorian politician, mayor of Quito (1988–1992).
René Quéré, 89, French painter and ceramist.
Adnan Abu Walid al-Sahrawi, 48, Moroccan Islamic militant, leader of the Islamic State in the Greater Sahara (since 2015), shot.
Saul Soliz, 55, American mixed martial arts trainer, COVID-19.
John Studd, 81, British gynaecologist.
Fereshteh Taerpour, 68, Iranian film producer, COVID-19.
Leonard Thompson, 69, American football player (Detroit Lions).
Maurice Vandeweyer, 76, Belgian writer and mathematician.

18
José Abueva, 93, Filipino political scientist, president of the University of the Philippines (1987–1993) and chancellor of UP Diliman (1990–1991).
Abdul Hamid AbuSulayman, 84, Saudi Islamic scholar and educationist, rector of the IIUM (1989–1999).
Muhammad Alim, 76, Indonesian jurist, judge of the Constitutional Court (2008–2015).
Franz Josef Altenburg, 80, Austrian ceramicist and sculptor.
Ron Cornelius, 76, American musician and record producer, complications from a stroke.
Guy de Rougemont, 86, French painter and sculptor.
Solly Drake, 90, American baseball player (Chicago Cubs, Los Angeles Dodgers, Philadelphia Phillies).
Joseph L. Galloway, 79, American newspaper correspondent and columnist.
Pablo P. Garcia, 95, Filipino politician, congressman (1987–1995, 2007–2013) and governor of Cebu (1995–2004).
Bojan Globočnik, 59, Slovenian Olympic ski jumper (1984). (death announced on this date)
B. Wayne Hughes, 87, American businessman, founder of Public Storage.
Gerry Jones, 75, English footballer (Stoke City, Macclesfield Town, Stafford Rangers).
Alejandro Lamalfa, 74, Spanish politician, mayor of Barruelo de Santullán (1990–2007, 2011–2016) and senator (1996–2000).
Austin Mitchell, 86, British politician, MP (1977–2015).
Jill Murphy, 72, British author (The Worst Witch), cancer.
Andrés Navarro, 83, Spanish Olympic boxer (1960).
Didier Notheaux, 73, French football player (Rouen, Lens) and manager (Burkina Faso national team).
Eric Poole, 79, Australian politician, Northern Territory MLA (1986–2001).
Robert Smith, 85, American sport executive and administrator, president of the International Baseball Federation (1981–1993).
Frank Soos, 70, American writer, bicycle accident.
Evgeny Sveshnikov, 71, Russian chess player and writer, complications from COVID-19.
Tomiyama Taeko, 99, Japanese visual artist.
Temur Tugushi, 49, Georgian footballer (Dinamo Batumi, Dinamo Tbilisi, national team), COVID-19.
Kaari Upson, 51, American artist, breast cancer.
Stephen Vizinczey, 88, Hungarian-Canadian author and writer.
E. J. Williams, 103, Canadian politician, Manitoba MLA (1958–1959).
Max Willis, 85, Australian politician, member (1970–1999) and president (1991–1998) of the New South Wales Legislative Council.
American hikers shot in a double homicide: (bodies discovered on this date)
Kylen Schulte, 24
Crystal Turner, 38

19
Junaid Babunagari, 67, Bangladeshi Islamic scholar and writer, amir of Hefazat-e-Islam Bangladesh (since 2020), stroke.
Gary Bouma, 79, American-born Australian sociologist and Anglican priest.
Trygve Brudevold, 100, Norwegian Olympic bobsledder (1952, 1956).
Carlo Cataldo, 88, Italian historian, poet, and teacher.
Raoul Cauvin, 82, Belgian comics writer (Les Tuniques Bleues, Agent 212, Les Femmes en Blanc).
Sonny Chiba, 82, Japanese actor (The Street Fighter, The Storm Riders, Kill Bill: Volume 1) and martial artist, complications from COVID-19.
Chuck Close, 81, American photorealist painter, heart failure.
William Clotworthy, 95, American television censor (Saturday Night Live) and writer.
Robert Cogan, 91, American music theorist and composer.
Arturo Cucciolla, 73, Italian architect.
Sir Michael Cullen, 76, New Zealand politician, MP (1981–2009), minister of finance (1999–2008), and deputy prime minister (2002–2008), lung cancer.
Bill Freehan, 79, American baseball player (Detroit Tigers) and coach (Michigan Wolverines), World Series champion (1968), complications from Alzheimer's disease.
Rod Gilbert, 80, Canadian Hall of Fame ice hockey player (New York Rangers).
Iohan Gueorguiev, 33, Bulgarian-born Canadian long-distance bikepacker, suicide.
Sir Peter Harding, 87, British air force officer, chief of the Air Staff (1988–1992) and Defence Staff (1992–1994).
Július Holeš, 82, Slovakian Olympic footballer (1968).
Olivia Jordan, 102, British World War II ambulance driver and interpreter.
Genevieve M. Knight, 82, American mathematician and educator, stroke.
Percha Leanpuri, 35, Indonesian politician, MP (since 2019), complications from childbirth.
Li Hsing, 91, Taiwanese film director (Beautiful Duckling, Execution in Autumn, The Heroic Pioneers), heart failure.
James W. Loewen, 79, American sociologist, historian, and author.
Wes Modder, 55, American marine and military chaplain.
O. M. Nambiar, 89, Indian athletics coach (P. T. Usha).
Enrique Sánchez Carrasco, 93, Spanish politician, mayor of Huesca (1987–1995).
Sandro Hit, 28, German dressage horse and sire, infection.
B. Senguttuvan, 65, Indian politician, MP (2014–2019).
Bill Sidwell, 101, Australian tennis player.
Robert D. Springer, 88, American lieutenant general.
Ramo Stott, 87, American racing driver, cancer.
Sergio Vuskovic, 90, Chilean politician, mayor of Valparaíso (1970–1973).
Keith Webb, 88, Australian footballer (Fitzroy).
Martin Wiggemansen, 64, Dutch footballer (Ajax, Lugano, PEC Zwolle).
Jean Yokum, 90, American financial executive.

20
Annegret Bollée, 84, German linguist.
Emilio Carrara, 75, Argentine politician, vice governor of Chaco Province (1987–1991).
Ian Carey, 45, American DJ and record producer.
Nino D'Agata, 65, Italian actor (The Consequences of Love, Giovanni Falcone, RIS Delitti Imperfetti) and voice actor.
Tom T. Hall, 85, American Hall of Fame singer-songwriter ("Harper Valley PTA", "I Love", "The Year That Clayton Delaney Died"), suicide.
Mark Hamister, 69, American arena football executive, owner of the Buffalo Destroyers (1999–2003) and Rochester Brigade (2001–2003), COVID-19.
Larry Harlow, 82, American salsa musician and composer, kidney disease.
Peter Ind, 93, British jazz double bassist and record producer.
Michael Morgan, 63, American conductor.
Spain Musgrove, 76, American football player (Washington Redskins, Houston Oilers).
Stephen B. Oates, 85, American professor and historian, cancer.
David Roberts, 78, American rock climber and author, complications from throat cancer.
Lester Salamon, 78, American political scientist.
Paolo Saviane, 59, Italian politician, senator (since 2018), complications from heart surgery.
Gaia Servadio, 82, Italian writer.
Michel Steiner, 74, French writer and psychoanalyst.
Robert B. Tanguy, 94, American Air Force major general, commandant of the Armed Forces Staff College (1980–1981).
Sally Tanner, 94, American politician, member of the California State Assembly (1978–1992).
Igor Vovkovinskiy, 38, Ukrainian-born American law student and actor.
Rebecca Wasserman-Hone, 84, American-French wine expert, chronic obstructive pulmonary disease.
Brent Yonts, 72, American politician, member of the Kentucky House of Representatives (1997–2016), COVID-19.

21
Ernest Aljančič Jr., 76, Slovenian ice hockey player (Yugoslavia national team).
Jarvis Astaire, 97, British boxing promoter and film producer (Agatha).
Clifford Barry, 75, Canadian Olympic water polo player (1972, 1976).
Chithra, 56, Indian actress (Manya Mahajanangale, Katha Ithuvare, Panchagni), cardiac arrest.
Budi Darma, 84, Indonesian writer and academic.
Nickolas Davatzes, 79, American television executive, founder of A&E Networks.
Rudolf Edlinger, 81, Austrian politician and football executive, minister of finance (1997–2000) and president of SK Rapid Wien (2001–2013).
Bill Emerson, 83, American five-string banjo player (The Country Gentlemen).
Don Everly, 84, American Hall of Fame singer (The Everly Brothers) and songwriter ("Cathy's Clown", "So Sad (To Watch Good Love Go Bad)").
Boutros Gemayel, 89, Lebanese Maronite Catholic prelate, archeparch of Cyprus (1988–2008).
Micki Grant, 92, American playwright (Your Arms Too Short to Box with God, Working) and actress (Another World).
Joe Grech, 66, Maltese snooker player.
Connie Hamzy, 66, American groupie.
Eddie Healey, 83, British businessman.
Reino Hiltunen, 96, Finnish Olympic triple jumper (1952).
Karolina Kaczorowska, 90, Polish academic, first lady in exile (1989–1990).
Paul Lokech, 55, Ugandan military officer, deputy inspector general of the National Police (since 2020), blood clot.
Countess Marie Kinsky of Wchinitz and Tettau, 81, Liechtensteiner royal, princess consort (since 1989), stroke.
Thad McClammy, 78, American politician, member of the Alabama House of Representatives (since 1994).
Larry Naviaux, 84, American football player and coach (Boston University Terriers).
Masanari Nihei, 80, Japanese actor (Ultraman), aspiration pneumonia.
Andreas Norland, 86, Norwegian newspaper editor (Aftenposten, Verdens Gang, Adresseavisen).
Tunji Olurin, 76, Nigerian general, military governor of Oyo State (1985–1988).
Jean Orchampt, 97, French Roman Catholic prelate, bishop of Angers (1974–2000).
Nicoletta Orsomando, 92, Italian continuity announcer (Rai 1).
Floyd Reese, 73, American football player (Montreal Alouettes), coach (Minnesota Vikings) and executive (Tennessee Titans), cancer.
Jeanne Robertson, 77, American humorist, motivational speaker and pageant winner, Miss North Carolina (1963).
Guy Sansaricq, 86, Haitian-born American Roman Catholic prelate, auxiliary bishop of Brooklyn (2006–2010).
Andrzej Schinzel, 84, Polish mathematician (Davenport–Schinzel sequence, Schinzel's hypothesis H).
Frank L. Schmidt, 77, American psychology professor (University of Iowa).
Anthony Scotto, 87, American mobster (Gambino crime family).
Kalyan Singh, 89, Indian politician, chief minister of Uttar Pradesh (1991–1992, 1997–1999) and governor of Rajasthan (2014–2019), multiple organ failure.
Arthur Smith, 106, English footballer (Bury, Leicester City).
Chris Torrance, 80, British poet.
Kostas Triantafyllopoulos, 65, Greek actor (Symmathites, Peninta Peninta, Kaneis de leei s' agapo) and voice actor.
Phil Valentine, 61, American talk radio show host (WWTN), COVID-19.
Nick Volpe, 95, Canadian football player (Toronto Argonauts).
Gabriel Kyungu wa Kumwanza, 82, Congolese politician, governor of Katanga (1991–1995, 1997), COVID-19.

22
Sir Eric Ash, 93, German-born British electrical engineer.
Alberto Bica, 63, Uruguayan footballer (Club Atlético Unión, Racing Club de Montevideo, national team), leukemia.
Álvaro Blancarte, 84, Mexican painter, sculptor and muralist.
Juan Carlos Blanco Estradé, 87, Uruguayan lawyer, politician and convicted criminal, minister of foreign relations (1972–1976).
William J. Boarman, 75, American printer, public printer of the U.S. (2010–2012).
George Bournoutian, 77, Iranian-American historian.
Charles Burles, 85, French tenor.
Kay Bullitt, 96, American civil rights activist and philanthropist.
Grange Calveley, 78, British writer (Roobarb, Noah and Nelly in... SkylArk) and artist, stroke complications.
Vivian Caver, 93, American politician, member of the Washington House of Representatives (1994–1995).
Lloyd Dobyns, 85, American news reporter (NBC News).
Mo Drake, 93, British advertising executive.
Pierre Dumay, 92, French racing driver.
Marilyn Eastman, 87, American actress (Night of the Living Dead).
Jean-Pierre Fragnière, 76, Swiss academic and political scientist.
Syed Shahid Hakim, 82, Indian Olympic football player (1960), manager (Bengal Mumbai) and referee, cardiac arrest.
Raymond Hamers, 88, Belgian immunologist.
Jack Hirschman, 87, American poet and social activist.
Marcos Libedinsky, 88, Chilean judge, member (1993–2008) and president of the Supreme Court (2004–2006).
Donna Merwick, 89, American-Australian historian.
Prabodhkant Pandya, 77, Indian politician, Gujarat MLA (1985–1995, 2002–2007).
Sheikh Shahidur Rahman, 70, Bangladeshi politician, MP (1986–1988), heart attack.
Nelly Restar, 81, Filipino Olympic sprinter (1964).
Edin Šaranović, 45, Bosnian football player (Sarajevo, Kamen Ingrad, national team) and manager, heart attack.
Powell St. John, 80, American singer and songwriter (Mother Earth).
Karl Traub, 80, German politician, member of the Landtag of Baden-Württemberg (1996–2016), heart attack.
Eric Wagner, 62, American heavy metal singer (Trouble), COVID-19.
Jane Wenham-Jones, 59, British writer and journalist (Woman's Weekly).
Douglas R. White, 79, American anthropologist.
John Wofford, 90, American equestrian, Olympic bronze medalist (1952).

23
Victoria Aguiyi-Ironsi, 97, Nigerian socialite, first lady (1966), stroke.
Peter Baumgartner, 82, Swiss cinematographer (Two Bavarians in Bonn, Jack the Ripper, Commando Leopard).
Dame Elizabeth Blackadder, 89, Scottish painter.
Brick Bronsky, 57, American professional wrestler (Stampede) and actor (Sgt. Kabukiman N.Y.P.D., The Quest), COVID-19.
Mamadouba Toto Camara, Guinean politician, minister of security and civil protection (2010–2014).
Babita Deokaran, South African anti-corruption whistleblower, shot.
Terry Driver, 56, Canadian convicted murderer, cancer.
Daniel Farhi, 79, French rabbi.
Tom Flynn, 66, American author, novelist, and editor (Free Inquiry), executive director of the Council for Secular Humanism.
Michael Gage, 76, American politician, member of the California State Assembly (1976–1980).
Robert Gerhart, 100, American politician, member of the Pennsylvania House of Representatives (1967–1968) and Senate (1969–1972).
Yusuf Grillo, 86, Nigerian artist, complications from COVID-19.
Jimmy Hayes, 31, American ice hockey player (Boston Bruins, Florida Panthers, Chicago Blackhawks).
Michèle Minerva, 62, French pétanque player.
Michael Nader, 76, American actor (Dynasty, All My Children, Lucky Chances), cancer.
Jean-Luc Nancy, 81, French philosopher.
Liam O'Brien, 72, Irish hurler (James Stephens).
Giovanni Pretorius, 49, South African Olympic boxer (1992), COVID-19.
Rosita Quintana, 96, Argentine-Mexican actress (Susana, The Price of Living, To the Four Winds) and singer, complications from thyroid surgery.
Gary Tricker, 82, New Zealand painter and printmaker, stroke.
Miguel Ángel Vicco, 76, Argentine presidential private secretary, complications from intestinal surgery.
Anestis Vlahos, 87, Greek actor (A Girl in Black, Young Aphrodites, The Man with the Carnation).
Olli Wisdom, 63, English musician (Specimen).
José Yudica, 85, Argentine football player (Boca Juniors, national team) and manager (Newell's Old Boys).

24
Kyle Anderson, 33, Australian darts player, kidney failure.
Ray Aspden, 83, English footballer (Rochdale).
Volodymyr Bondarenko, 68, Ukrainian politician, MP (1996–2014) and head of the Kyiv City State Administration (2014).
Alain Boudet, 71, French poet.
Claude Bourrigault, 89, French footballer (Angers SCO, Stade Rennais F.C.).
O. Chandrashekar, 85, Indian Olympic footballer (1960).
Anatoliy Chizhov, 87, Russian engineer and politician, Soviet deputy (1989–1991).
Bruce Culpan, 91, New Zealand rower.
Ivan Dorovský, 86, Czech Slavist and Balkanologist.
Olabiyi Durojaiye, 88, Nigerian politician, senator (1999–2003), COVID-19.
Pierre Dutot, 75, French trumpeter and professor.
Dale Derby, 72, American politician, member of the Oklahoma House of Representatives (2017–2019), drowned.
Léopold K. Fakambi, 78, Beninese agronomist and engineer.
Nicholas Felice, 94, American politician, mayor of Fair Lawn, New Jersey (1972–1974) and member of the New Jersey General Assembly (1982–2002).
P. J. Garvey, 50, Irish hurler (Hospital-Herbertstown) and Gaelic footballer (Limerick).
Hissène Habré, 79, Chadian politician and convicted war criminal, prime minister (1978–1979) and president (1982–1990), COVID-19.
Jerry Harkness, 81, American basketball player (Indiana Pacers, New York Knicks), NCAA champion (1963).
Elia Hernández Núñez, 59, Mexican politician, deputy (2006–2009).
Harry Kent, 74, New Zealand Olympic cyclist (1972).
Olga Lipovskaya, 67, Russian journalist and feminist.
Calogero Lo Giudice, 83, Italian politician, president of Sicily (1982–1983).
Michel Marot, 95, French architect.
Yasuko Matsuda, 84, Japanese Olympic shot putter (1960).
Fritz McIntyre, 62, English keyboardist (Simply Red).
Mohd Ghazali Mohd Seth, 92, Malaysian military officer, chief of army (1977–1982) and defence forces (1982–1985).
Nadir Nadirov, 89, Kazakh engineer.
Norman Pender, 73, Scottish rugby union player (South of Scotland, national team), heart attack.
Mario Pennacchia, 93, Italian journalist and writer.
Wynn Roberts, 97, Australian actor (Prisoner, Consider Your Verdict, Picnic at Hanging Rock).
Mangala Samaraweera, 65, Sri Lankan politician, MP (1989–2020) and minister of foreign affairs (2005–2007, 2015–2017), COVID-19.
John Sheridan, 75, American jazz pianist and arranger, cancer.
Jan Suchý, 76, Czech ice hockey player (HC Dukla Jihlava), Olympic silver medalist (1968).
Wilfried Van Moer, 76, Belgian footballer (Standard Liège, national team), stroke.
George S. Vest, 102, American diplomat, ambassador to the European Union (1981–1985).
Charlie Watts, 80, English Hall of Fame drummer (The Rolling Stones, Blues Incorporated).

25
Mohsin Ahmad al-Aini, 88, Yemeni politician, prime minister (1967, 1969, 1970–1971, 1971–1972, 1974–1975).
Gerry Ashmore, 85, English motor racing driver, cancer.
Subhankar Banerjee, 55, Indian tabla player, complications from COVID-19.
Gunilla Bergström, 79, Swedish children's book writer and illustrator (Alfie Atkins).
Ethel Brez, 84, American television writer (Days of Our Lives, One Life to Live, Passions).
Eduardo Brizuela del Moral, 77, Argentine politician, senator (2001–2003), governor of Catamarca Province (2003–2011), and deputy (since 2013), pneumonia.
Antônio Câmara, 83, Brazilian politician, Rio Grande do Norte MLA (1966–1982), secretary-general of the Brazilian Democratic Movement (1982), and member of the Constituent Assembly (1988–1991).
Metin Çekmez, 76, Turkish actor (Tatlı Dillim, The Shadow Play, Adını Feriha Koydum), cancer.
Max Cryer, 85, New Zealand television host and author.
Ted Dexter, 86, English cricketer (Sussex, national team).
Paul Dukes, 87, British historian.
Aldo Eminente, 90, French swimmer, Olympic bronze medallist (1952).
Mario Gareña, 88, Colombian singer and composer.
Leo Gately, 84, Australian politician, Queensland MLA (1986–1989).
Manuel Guerra Gómez, 90, Spanish priest and sectologist.
Mario Guilloti, 75, Argentine boxer, Olympic bronze medalist (1968).
Milan Gutović, 75, Serbian actor (A Tight Spot, Bela lađa) and comedian, complications from COVID-19.
Ileana Gyulai-Drîmbă-Jenei, 75, Romanian fencer, Olympic bronze medallist (1968, 1972).
Said al-Harumi, 49, Israeli politician, member of the Knesset (since 2017), heart attack.
Ida Keeling, 106, American centenarian track and field athlete.
Robin Miller, 71, American motorsports journalist (The Indianapolis Star, Speed Channel, NBCSN), multiple myeloma and leukemia.
Jonathan Myles-Lea, 52, British painter, cancer.
B. V. Nimbkar, 90, Indian agricultural scientist.
Gail Omvedt, 80, American-born Indian sociologist and human rights activist.
Zdenka Procházková, 95, Czech actress (A Dead Man Among the Living, Steam Above a Pot, May Events).
Bobby Waddell, 81, Scottish footballer (Dundee, East Fife).
Zheng Zhemin, 96, Chinese explosives engineer and physicist, member of the Chinese Academy of Sciences and Chinese Academy of Engineering.
Susana Zimmermann, 88, Argentine dancer and choreographer.

26
Rodolfo Aínsa, 76, Spanish politician and businessman, president of the Province of Huesca (1995–1999) and senator (2004–2008).
Neal Brendel, 66, American rugby union player (national team) and executive, chairman of USA Rugby (2002–2005), mesothelioma.
Charles Chuka, 68, Malawian economist, governor of the Reserve Bank of Malawi (2012–2017).
Franciszek Gąsior, 74, Polish Olympic handball player (1972).
Marco Hausiku, 67, Namibian politician, minister of foreign affairs (2004–2010).
Rafael Hechanova, 93, Filipino Olympic basketball player (1952).
JB Tuhure, 78, Nepali singer and politician, MP (2014–2017).
Kenny Malone, 83, American drummer, COVID-19.
Wataru Mimura, 67, Japanese screenwriter (Godzilla), multiple system atrophy.
Hans Müller, 90, Swiss Olympic figure skater (1956).
Victor Olaotan, 69, Nigerian actor (Tinsel, Three Wise Men), complications from a traffic collision.
Taffy Owen, 85, Welsh speedway rider.
Jérôme Proulx, 91, Canadian politician, Quebec MNA (1966–1970, 1976–1985).
Aleś Razanaŭ, 73, Belarusian poet and translator.
Sompote Sands, 80, Thai film director (Hanuman and the Five Riders, Crocodile, Magic Lizard), cancer.
Vladimir Shadrin, 73, Russian ice hockey player (HC Spartak Moscow, Oji Eagles) and coach, Olympic champion (1972, 1976), COVID-19.
Jerry Thompson, 98, American Olympic distance runner (1948).
French Tickner, 91, American-Canadian voice actor (Death Note, Inuyasha, Madeline).
Stanley A. Weiss, 94, American mining executive and writer, founder of Business Executives for National Security.

27
Stjepan Babić, 95, Croatian linguist, MP (1993–1997).
Priscilla Baltazar-Padilla, 63, Filipino jurist, associate justice of the Supreme Court (2020).
Jim Bartlett, 89, Canadian ice hockey player (New York Rangers, Boston Bruins, Montreal Canadiens).
Jean-Pierre Bastiani, 71, French politician, mayor of Auterive (1989–2008, 2014–2018) and deputy (1993–1997).
Noor Islam Dawar, Pakistani activist, shot.
Edmond H. Fischer, 101, American biochemist, Nobel Prize laureate (1992).
Beniamino Giribaldi, 79, Italian organ builder.
Mizanul Haque, 76, Bangladeshi politician, MP (1991–2001).
Anne Jolliffe, 87, Australian animator (Yellow Submarine).
Babette Josephs, 81, American politician, member of the Pennsylvania House of Representatives (1985–2012), cancer.
Hae Un Lee, 79, South Korean-born American businessman, founder of Lee's Discount Liquor.
Hermann Kinder, 77, German writer.
Siegfried Matthus, 87, German composer (Judith) and opera festival director (Kammeroper Schloss Rheinsberg).
N. V. Nambiathiri, 89, Indian Sanskrit scholar and educator. (death announced on this date)
Peter McNamee, 86, Scottish footballer (Peterborough United, Notts County).
Daasebre Oti Boateng, 83, Ghanaian academic and traditional ruler, omanhene of New Juaben (since 1992). (death announced on this date)
Rubina Saigol, Pakistani feminist scholar and women's rights activist.
Sam Salter, 46, American R&B singer.
L. Neil Smith, 75, American science fiction author (The Lando Calrissian Adventures).
Nenad Trinajstić, 84, Croatian chemist.
Akis Tsochatzopoulos, 82, Greek politician and convicted criminal, MP (1981–2007), minister of the interior (1987–1989, 1993–1995) and national defence (1996–2001).
Joan Whalley, 93, Australian actress.
Lucille Whipper, 93, American politician, member of the South Carolina House of Representatives (1985–1995).
Johnny Williamson, 92, English footballer (Manchester City, Blackburn Rovers).
Peter Zimmerman, 80, American nuclear physicist and arms control expert.

28
Nasrul Abit, 66, Indonesian politician, vice governor of West Sumatra (2016–2021), COVID-19.
Joan Almond, 86, American photographer.
John Anton, 94, English cricketer (Cambridge University, Worcestershire).
Alioune Badara Cissé, 63, Senegalese lawyer and politician, foreign minister (2012), COVID-19.
Pierre Bourque, 62, Canadian race car driver, journalist and politician, member of the Ottawa City Council (1991), heart attack.
Francesc Burrull, 86, Spanish jazz musician and composer.
Bulbul Chowdhury, 74, Bangladeshi writer, cancer.
Noel Cringle, 83, Manx politician, president of Tynwald (2000–2011).
Pablo Dabezies, 81, Uruguayan priest and theologian.
Jacques Drouin, 78, Canadian animator and director (Mindscape).
Joye Evans, 92, New Zealand Girl Guides leader.
Bob Fisher, 92, Australian footballer (Hawthorn).
Giraldo González, 63, Cuban baseball player, COVID-19.
Roman Gromadskiy, 80, Russian actor (King Lear, A Lover's Romance, The Circus Burned Down, and the Clowns Have Gone).
Ahmad Sarji Abdul Hamid, 82, Malaysian civil servant, chief secretary to the government (1990–1996), COVID-19.
Jiang Chunyun, 91, Chinese politician, governor of Shandong (1987–1988) and vice premier (1995–1998).
Jin Renqing, 77, Chinese politician, director of the State Taxation Administration (1998–2003) and minister of finance (2003–2007), house fire.
Dimitri Kitsikis, 86, Greek academic.
Sam Oji, 35, English footballer (Tamworth, Limerick, Hednesford Town).
Victor Uwaifo, 80, Nigerian musician.
Teresa Żylis-Gara, 91, Polish operatic soprano (Metropolitan Opera).

29
Ed Asner, 91, American actor (The Mary Tyler Moore Show, Lou Grant, Up), president of the Screen Actors Guild (1981–1985), seven-time Emmy winner.
Barthélémy Attisso, Togolese lawyer and guitarist (Orchestra Baobab).
Kolë Berisha, 73, Kosovar politician, chairman of the Assembly (2006–2007).
Ron Bushy, 79, American drummer (Iron Butterfly), esophageal cancer.
Sione Vuna Fa'otusia, 68, Tongan politician, deputy (since 2014), minister for justice and prisons (2014–2019), and deputy prime minister (2019–2020).
Peggy Farrell, 89, American costume designer (Dog Day Afternoon, Holocaust, The Stepford Wives), Emmy winner (1978).
Fran Frisch, 73, American cartoonist, prostate cancer.
Alex Gallacher, 67, Scottish-born Australian politician, senator (since 2011), lung cancer.
Buddhadeb Guha, 85, Indian writer, complications from COVID-19.
Tudor Gunasekara, 86, Sri Lankan politician and diplomat, MP (1977–1983), COVID-19.
Muhammad Hamza, 92, Pakistani politician, deputy (1985–1988, 1990–1999) and senator (2012–2018), complications from COVID-19.
John A. Kaneb, 86, American businessman, CEO of HP Hood, part-owner of the Boston Red Sox, complications from heart surgery.
Joe McInnes, 88, Scottish footballer (Kilmarnock, Partick Thistle, Stirling Albion).
Manuel Monerris, 75, Spanish politician, mayor of Ferreries (2011–2015) and member of the Parliament of the Balearic Islands (2011–2015).
Mikhail Nenashev, 61, Russian politician, deputy (2007–2011), cardiac arrest.
Pat Nolan, 84, Irish hurler (Wexford).
Lee "Scratch" Perry, 85, Jamaican reggae musician (The Upsetters), songwriter ("Run for Cover", "Police and Thieves") and record producer.
Yuri Pudyshev, 67, Belarusian football player (Dinamo Minsk, Dynamo Yakutsk, Soviet Union national team) and manager.
Rodney Rice, 76, Irish journalist and broadcaster.
Jacques Rogge, 79, Belgian Olympic sailor (1968, 1972, 1976) and sports administrator, president of the IOC (2001–2013).
Valer Săsărman, 52, Romanian football player (Gloria Bistrița) and manager (FC Bistrița), stroke.
Michael Simon, 73, American ceramic artist.
Lajim Ukin, 66, Malaysian politician, MP (2008–2013) and Sabah MLA (2013–2018), COVID-19.
Robert Wolke, 93, American chemist, complications from Alzheimer's disease.

30
Sune Bergman, 68, Swedish ice hockey player (Troja-Ljungby) and coach (HV71, Frisk Asker).
Anand Dev Bhatt, 84, Nepalese writer and politician, president of the Progressive Writers' Movement.
José María Libório Camino Saracho, 89, Spanish Roman Catholic prelate, bishop of Presidente Prudente (2002–2008) and Urusi (1999–2002) and auxiliary bishop of São Miguel Paulista (1999–2002).
Junior Coffey, 79, American football player (Green Bay Packers, Atlanta Falcons, New York Giants), heart failure.
Nelson Cowles, 90, American politician, member of the Texas House of Representatives (1961–1967). 
Bjarne Fiskum, 82, Norwegian violinist, conductor, and pedagogue.
Jean-Louis Fiszman, 60–61, French caricaturist and comic book author.
Claude Guichard, 92, French politician, deputy (1967–1968, 1968–1972).
Marcel Henry, 94, French politician, senator (1977–2004).
Latif Nassif Jassim, 80, Iraqi politician and convicted murderer, minister of agriculture (1977–1979).
Saleem Kidwai, 70, Indian historian and LGBT rights activist.
Ray Kinasewich, 87, Canadian ice hockey player (Hershey Bears) and coach (Edmonton Oilers).
Benjamin Woods Labaree, 94, American historian.
Mal Z. Lawrence, 88, American comedian and actor (Rounders).
Oliver Loftéen, 42, Swedish actor (Underground Secrets, Tic Tac, Vägen ut).
Allen Lowrie, 72, Australian botanist.
David Luscombe, 83, British historian.
Maggie Mae, 61, German singer, COVID-19.
Pat Maginnis, 93, American abortion-rights activist.
Giuseppe Marchetti, 86, Italian literary critic and journalist.
Seán McGuinness, 76, Irish hurling manager (Down GAA).
Messaoud Nedjahi, 67, Algerian writer and singer-songwriter, COVID-19.
Vsevolod Ovchinnikov, 94, Russian journalist and writer-publicist.
Brian Packer, 77, British Olympic boxer (1964).
Vasoo Paranjape, 82, Indian cricketer (Mumbai, Baroda) and coach.
*Sakaran Dandai, 91, Malaysian politician, MP (1986–1995), chief minister (1994) and governor (1995–2002) of Sabah, COVID-19.
Zurab Samadashvili, 66, Georgian writer and playwright, cirrhosis.
Sadashiv Sathe, 95, Indian sculptor.
Cecil Souders, 100, American football player (Detroit Lions).
Robert David Steele, 69, American computer scientist and historian, COVID-19.
Summerly, 19, American racehorse, colic. (death announced on this date)
Vicki Trickett, 82, American actress (The Three Stooges Meet Hercules, The Tab Hunter Show, The Adventures of Ozzie and Harriet).
Wang Kuang-hui, 56, Taiwanese baseball player (Brother Elephants) and coach, liver cancer.
Lee Williams, 75, American gospel singer.

31
Tamilla Agamirova, 93, Russian actress (Don Quixote, Matteo Falcone).
Léon Aimé, 97, French politician, deputy (1993–1997).
Vasile Belous, 33, Moldovan Olympic boxer (2012), traffic collision.
Sal Cenicola, 62, American boxer, restaurateur and actor.
Michael Constantine, 94, American actor (My Big Fat Greek Wedding, Room 222, The Hustler), Emmy winner (1970).
Robbie Dale, 81, British radio DJ.
Sebastiano Dho, 86, Italian Roman Catholic prelate, bishop of Saluzzo (1986–1993) and Alba (1993–2010).
Julie Ditty, 42, American tennis player, cancer.
Geronimo, 8, New Zealand-born British alpaca.
Bashir Al Helal, 85, Bangladeshi novelist.
Anatoly Kavkayev, 72, Russian Greco-Roman wrestler, European champion (1974).
Oleg Khlestov, 98, Russian diplomat and legal academic.
Přemysl Krbec, 81, Czech Olympic gymnast (1964).
Mahal, 46, Filipino actress and comedian, COVID-19.
Roman Malinowski, 86, Polish politician and economist, deputy, (1976–1989), deputy prime minister (1980–1985) and marshal of the Sejm (1985–1989).
Kebby Maphatsoe, 58, South African politician, MP (since 2009).
Les Martyn, 89, Australian sports administrator.
Nobesuthu Mbadu, 76, South African mbaqanga singer (Mahotella Queens), kidney failure.
Francesco Morini, 77, Italian footballer (Sampdoria, Juventus, national team).
Francisco Monterrosa, 52, Mexican Zapotec visual artist, muralist, and engraver, COVID-19.
Kazimieras Motieka, 91, Lithuanian politician and lawyer, member of the Supreme Soviet (1989–1990) and Supreme Council (1990–1992).
Heru Nerly, 40, Indonesian footballer (Persipura Jayapura, national team).
Goran Obradović, 34, Serbian footballer (Gandzasar, Mika, Lanexang United), suicide.
K. P. Pillai, 91, Indian film director.
Theresa Plummer-Andrews, 77, British television producer (Bob the Builder, The Animals of Farthing Wood, Little Robots).
Ferhan Şensoy, 70, Turkish actor (When Luck Breaks the Door, Pardon, Son Ders) and playwright, internal hemorrhage.
George S. Tolley, 95, American agricultural economist.
Thompson Usiyan, 65, Nigerian footballer (Montreal Manic, Tulsa Roughnecks, national team).
Xu Houze, 87, Chinese geodesist and geophysicist, member of the Chinese Academy of Sciences.

References

2021-08
08